The Robinson oscillator is an electronic oscillator circuit originally devised for use in the field of continuous wave (CW) nuclear magnetic resonance (NMR). It was a development of the marginal oscillator. Strictly one should distinguish between the marginal oscillator and the Robinson oscillator, although sometimes they are conflated and referred to as a Robinson marginal oscillator. Modern magnetic resonance imaging (MRI) systems are based on pulsed (or Fourier transform) NMR; they do not rely on the use of such oscillators.

The key feature of a Robinson oscillator is a limiter in the feedback loop. This means that a square wave current, of accurately-fixed amplitude, is fed back to the tank circuit. The tank selects the fundamental of the square wave, which is amplified and fed back. This results in an oscillation with well-defined amplitude; the voltage across the tank circuit is proportional to its Q-factor.

The marginal oscillator has no limiter. It is arranged for the working point of one of the amplifier elements to operate at a nonlinear part of its characteristic and this determines the amplitude of oscillation. This is not as stable as the Robinson arrangement.

The Robinson oscillator was invented by British physicist Neville Robinson.

References 
 Robinson, F. N. H., Nuclear Resonance Absorption Circuit, Journal of Scientific Instruments, 36: 481-487 (1959)
 Deschamps, P., Vaissiére, J. and Sullivan, N. S., Integrated circuit Robinson oscillator for NMR detection, Review of Scientific Instruments, 48(6):664–668, June 1977. DOI 10.1063/1.1135103 
 Wilson, K. J. and Vallabhan, C. P. G., An improved MOSFET-based Robinson oscillator for NMR detection, Meas. Sci. Technol., 1(5):458-460, May 1990. DOI 10.1088/0957-0233/1/5/015

Nuclear magnetic resonance
Electronic oscillators